Captain is a 1994 Indian action thriller film written and directed by Kodi Ramakrishna and produced by R. B. Choudary of Super Good Films. The film, a Tamil-Telugu bilingual, stars R. Sarathkumar, Sukanya, and Ranjitha. It was released on 25 February 1994. This was Kodi Ramakrishna's only straight Tamil film he had directed.

Plot 

Kannayiram (Tamil) / Kannappa Rao (Telugu) is a powerful mafia lord. He, along with his sons Vijaya (Rocky) and Jaya (Devan), spread terror around the Chennai (Vishakhapatnam in Telugu version) town. They are known for land grabbing. One day, Vijaya and Jaya threaten Ramasamy (Sarath Babu) to give his land in which there is an orphanage, but Ramasamy refuses categorically. Unfortunately, he is brutally killed in front of Gowri (Ranjitha). The information reaches his brother Shiva (R. Sarathkumar), a short-tempered soldier. His superiors reject his request to leave the military camp, so he flees the camp. In the past, Shiva was in love with Uma (Sukanya), but she died in a plane crash. Later, Shiva complains against Kannayiram and hires lawyer Lakshmi Narayanan (Janagaraj). Lakshmi Narayanan's daughter Gowri, who is dumb, becomes the eyewitness of the case. What transpires next forms the rest of the story.

Cast 

 R. Sarathkumar as Captain Shiva
 Sukanya as Uma
 Ranjitha as Gowri
 Raghuvaran as Kannayiram / Kannappa Rao in Telugu Version
 Sarath Babu as Ramasamy
 Janagaraj as Lakshmi Narayanan
 Costumes Krishna as Tiger Thatha Chari
 Rocky as Vijaya
 Devan as Jaya
 Sudha as Lakshmi
 Sangeeta
 Ramesh Khanna
 Raju Sundaram
 Adhithya
 Thillai Rajan
 Raji
 R. Subramaniam
 Kanal Kannan as Auto Driver (special appearance)

Soundtrack 
The music was composed by Sirpy.

Tamil

Telugu

Release and reception 
Captain was released on 25 February 1994, alongside another Sarathkumar starrer Aranmanai Kaavalan. Malini Mannath, writing for The Indian Express, panned the film: "An insipid screenplay, jerky narration, careless handling of the subject, lack of continuity in scenes and lacklustre performances make Captain one of the worst of [Sarath] Kumar's films". R. P. R. of Kalki wrote that by looking at the title, he thought this to be a story about a soldier who received medal, but to his dismay, it has elements of military hotel, action, explosion, murder here and there it is a terrible rupture; on one side let it be that the film offers nothing new but do not understand what it is.

References

External links 
 

1994 multilingual films
1990s Tamil-language films
1994 films
Films directed by Kodi Ramakrishna
Indian multilingual films
1990s Telugu-language films
Super Good Films films